Ivanhoe is a city in Lincoln County, Minnesota, United States. The population was 559 at the 2010 census. Since 1902 it has been the county seat of Lincoln County and is now the least populous county seat in Minnesota.

History
Ivanhoe was platted in 1901. It was named from the novel Ivanhoe by Sir Walter Scott. A post office has been in operation at Ivanhoe since 1901. Ivanhoe was named county seat in 1902. Richard Mulder (1938-2022), physician and Minnesota state legislator, lived in Ivanhoe.

Geography

The Yellow Medicine River flows past Ivanhoe as an intermittent stream near its headwaters.

U.S. Highway 75 and Minnesota State Highway 19 are two of the main routes in the city.

Demographics

Rather unusually for rural southwestern Minnesota, a high percentage of Ivanhoe's residents are of Polish ancestry.

2010 census
As of the census of 2010, there were 559 people, 268 households, and 144 families residing in the city. The racial makeup of the city was 99.8% White and 0.2% from other races. Hispanic or Latino of any race were 0.4% of the population.

There were 268 households, of which 21.3% had children under the age of 18 living with them, 44.0% were married couples living together, 7.1% had a female householder with no husband present, 2.6% had a male householder with no wife present, and 46.3% were non-families. 42.9% of all households were made up of individuals, and 23.2% had someone living alone who was 65 years of age or older. The average household size was 1.99 and the average family size was 2.74.

The median age in the city was 49.5 years. 18.8% of residents were under the age of 18; 5.3% were between the ages of 18 and 24; 20.4% were from 25 to 44; 27.1% were from 45 to 64; and 28.3% were 65 years of age or older. The gender makeup of the city was 44.9% male and 55.1% female.

2000 census
As of the census of 2000, there were 679 people, 310 households, and 172 families residing in the city. The racial make up of the city was 99.71% White. Hispanic or Latino of any race were 0.29% of the population.

There were 310 households, out of which 26.8% had children under the age of 18 living with them, 44.2% were married couples living together, 7.4% had a female householder with no husband present, and 44.2% were non-families. 41.0% of all households were made up of individuals, and 25.5% had someone living alone who was 65 years of age or older.  The average household size was 2.05 and the average family size was 2.80.

In the city, the population was spread out, with 21.8% under the age of 18, 5.4% from 18 to 24, 22.5% from 25 to 44, 20.8% from 45 to 64, and 29.5% who were 65 years of age or older.  The median age was 45 years. For every 100 females, there were 85.5 males.  For every 100 females age 18 and over, there were 81.8 males.

The median income for a household in the city was $28,125, and the median income for a family was $40,491. Males had a median income of $27,946 versus $21,389 for females. The per capita income for the city was $17,775.  About 4.6% of families and 8.6% of the population were below the poverty line, including 5.0% of those under age 18 and 21.8% of those age 65 or over.

References

External links

City Website

Cities in Minnesota
Cities in Lincoln County, Minnesota
County seats in Minnesota